Lissotesta minutissima is a species of sea snail, a marine gastropod mollusk, unassigned in the superfamily Seguenzioidea.

Description

Distribution
This species occurs in the Ross Sea, Antarctica.

References

 Engl W. (2012) Shells of Antarctica. Hackenheim: Conchbooks. 402 pp.

minutissima
Gastropods described in 1907